Mian Naseer Ahmad is a Pakistani politician who was a Member of the Provincial Assembly of the Punjab, from 2008 till May 2018 and from August 2018 till January 2023.He has the degree of Master of Business Administration from ILM in Lahore.

Political career

He was elected to the Provincial Assembly of the Punjab as a candidate of PML-N from Constituency PP-155 (Lahore-XIX) in 2008 Pakistani general election. He received 33,051 votes and defeated a candidate of PPP.

He was re-elected to the Provincial Assembly of the Punjab as a candidate of PML-N from Constituency PP-155 (Lahore-XIX) in 2013 Pakistani general election.

He was re-elected to Provincial Assembly of the Punjab as a candidate of PML-N from Constituency PP-163 (Lahore-XX) in 2018 Pakistani general election.

References

Living people
Punjab MPAs 2013–2018
1975 births
Pakistan Muslim League (N) MPAs (Punjab)
Punjab MPAs 2008–2013
Punjab MPAs 2018–2023